Andrew Crockett may refer to:

Andrew Crockett (banker) (1943–2012)
Andrew Crockett, Tennessee settler, of Andrew Crockett House